Neocalanus is a genus of marine copepods. They are a dominant component of the open water ecosystems of the northern Pacific Ocean.

Species
There are six species:

Life cycle

Neocalanus flemingeri 
Neocalanus flemingeri is predominantly annual, with a significant fraction of biennials in some areas.

Trophic interactions
Neocalanus are important food items for many predators, such as North Pacific right whale and least auklet.

References

Calanoida
Crustacean genera
Taxa named by Georg Ossian Sars